Bjørn Stybert (16 January 1927 – 26 August 2009) was a Danish rower. He competed in the men's eight event at the 1952 Summer Olympics.

References

1927 births
2009 deaths
Danish male rowers
Olympic rowers of Denmark
Rowers at the 1952 Summer Olympics
Rowers from Copenhagen